Hassan Abya (1962) is a cabinet member in the Moroccan government under Saad Eddine El Othmani. As of October 2019, He is the Moroccan Minister of Culture and Communication, the Minister of Youth and Sports, and the government spokesperson.

Personal life 
Abya was born in Rass El Ain in the Settat region of Morocco. He earned his bachelor's in 1989 and Master's degrees in economic geography.  In 2010, he earned his doctorate in geopolitical studies from Mohammed V University in Rabat. He worked as a professor in the Faculty of Letters at Ben M'Sick University.

Life in Government 
In 2018, he was elected president of the Arab Liberal Federation.

In October 2019, he was appointed by King Mohammed VI to serve as the Minister of Culture and Communication, the Minister of Youth and Sports as well as the government spokesperson under Head of Government Saad Eddine El Othmani in a government reshuffle.

Abyaba has already had to address the world speaking for the government on issues such as crackdowns such as the arrest and imprisonment of Moroccan Rapper Gnawi for a controversial video, leading to questions about freedom of expression in Morocco.

As Minister of Culture, he is working with IESCO to put more Moroccan heritage sites on the Islamic World Heritage Site list.

References 

1962 births
Morocco government officials
Living people
People from Settat
Mohammed V University alumni